Água e Luz (Water and Light) is an album by the Brazilian singer Joyce, that was released on the Odeon label in 1981.

Like Feminina from the previous year, this recording features an all-star line up of Brazilian musicians, including the accordionist Sivuca on Samba de Gago. The track Monsieur Binot achieved chart success in Brazil. Agua e luz and Feminina are often released together on one CD.

Track listing

Personnel
 Joyce – vocals, classical guitar
 Danilo Caymmi – flute
 Paulo Guimaraes – flute
 Mauro Senise – flute, saxophones
 Alfredo Cardim – piano
 Haroldo Mauro Jr. – piano
 Sivuca – accordion
 Fernando Leporace – bass guitar, vocals
 Tutti Moreno – drums, percussion
 Chico Adnet – vocals
 Lize Bravo – vocals
 Ceu da Boca – vocals
 Edson Lobo – vocals
 Raimundo Nicioli – vocals
 Paulinho Pauliera – vocals
 Ronald Valle – vocals
 Clainha, Aninha, Marya & Rita – vocals

References

1981 albums
Joyce Moreno (musician) albums